Flexible may refer to:

Science and technology
 Power cord, a flexible electrical cable.
 Flexible cable, an Electrical cable as used on electrical appliances
 Flexible electronics
 Flexible response
 Flexible-fuel vehicle
 Flexible rake receiver
 Flexible AC transmission system
 Semi-flexible rod polymer
 Flexible algebra, in non-associative algebras, for example alternative algebras
 Flexible polyhedron
 Flexible single master operation

Other uses
 "Flexible", a song by Depeche Mode
 Flexible mold
 Flextime, a variable work schedule
 Flexible spending account, a tax-advantaged savings account
 Flexible baton round, fired as a shotgun shell
 Flxible, originally the Flexible Sidecar Co.

See also
 Flexibility (disambiguation)
 Bendable (disambiguation)
 Rollable (disambiguation)
 Flex (disambiguation)